A vowel dimension is an aspect of a vowel's pronunciation, involving a phonological or phonetic feature which is utilised in a language.

The basic vowel dimensions are generally viewed as being vowel backness and height; these dimensions are manifested in most of the world's languages. (Some languages, though, distinguish vertical vowel systems, which are usually based around a contrast in height: Arrernte, Ubykh and Wichita are three such languages.) These two phonological features are generally viewed to be true "dimensions", since they correspond to actual spatial movement in two physical dimensions. These dimensions can be extraordinarily complex in themselves; the Bavarian dialect of German exhibits five height contrasts.

However, other dimensions can exist (see also vowel), sometimes quite complex ones. Half-rounding and rounding in some dialects of Swedish mean that these dialects exhibit a three-dimensional vowel system, with non-binary oppositions in each direction.

See also
 Vertical vowel system

Vowels